Amal Aloy is a daily political cartoon strip published in Sangbad Pratidin for over a decade. It is drawn by veteran Bengali cartoonist Amal Chakrabarti.

References 

Indian comic strips